Marina Niava (born 1985) is an Ivorian film director, film producer, and writer.

Biography
Niava is the youngest daughter of Pierre and Cécile Niava, both language teachers. She developed an early interest in the arts and literature and won several literary prizes. She graduated from Lycée Sainte Marie d'Abidjan and received the Series A Excellence Award. After receiving her diploma in Journalism and Audiovisual Production from the Institut des Sciences et Techniques de la Communication, Niava won a competition run by Radio JAM in Abidjan and began her career as a trainee host. She later worked as a journalist for Africa 24. Niava developed her interest in the cinema while filming a commercial.

From 2009 to 2010, Niava served as a co-writer for season 1 of the TV series Teenager, which received the award for best African series at the Vues d'Afrique Festival in Montreal. She moved to Oslo, Norway in 2010 and became communication director of the African Cultural Center. Niava oversaw the 2010 and 2011 Kino Afrika film festivals in Oslo. She was an BENIANH International Foundation's Excellent Scholarship Program laureate in 2012.

In October 2012, she directed her first documentary, Noirs au soleil levant, about the lives of African students in Tsukuba, Japan. Niava's first fictional short film, 21, was completed in December 2013. It was financed by funds from the Organisation internationale de la Francophonie. 21 is about a young woman who cannot stand her mother's younger lover and was the only African film screened at the Oakland International Film Festival. Niava directed the short tragedy Worse in 2014. She worked as the special effects coordinator for the 2015 film Advantageous.

Niava completed her master's degree in Film and Television at Academy of Art University. In 2017, Niava wrote her first novel, American Dreamer. It was a finalist for the 10th Prix Ivoire pour la Littérature Africaine d’Expression Francophone.

Partial filmography
2009-2010: Teenager (TV series, co-writer)
2012: Noirs au soleil levant (short film, director)
2013: 21 (short film, writer/director) 
2014: Worse (short film, writer/director)

References

External links
Marina Niava at the Internet Movie Database

1985 births
Living people
Ivorian film producers
Ivorian film directors
Ivorian women writers
Academy of Art University alumni
Ivorian women film producers
Ivorian women film directors
Ivorian screenwriters
Women screenwriters
21st-century women writers
21st-century screenwriters